Baligubadle District is a district in the Maroodi Jeex region of Somaliland. The district was created in 2019 and was carved out of the wider Hargeisa District. The capital of the district is Baligubadle. which straddles the border with the Somali Region of Ethiopia.

Economy
The district's inhabitants are mostly pastoralist whereby the local economy is predominantly dependent on livestock trade, however small-scale rain fed farming is also practiced.

Demographics
The district has approximately 40,000 inhabitants. The district is wholly dominated by the Arap clan, part of the wider Isaaq clan-family.

See also
Administrative divisions of Somaliland
Regions of Somaliland
Districts of Somaliland

References

Districts of Somaliland
Maroodi Jeex